Blaguš is a small settlement in the Municipality of Sveti Jurij ob Ščavnici in northeastern Slovenia. The area is part of the traditional region of Styria. It is now included with the rest of the municipality in the Mura Statistical Region.

A number of Roman-period burial mounds have been identified close to the settlement.

References

External links
Blaguš at Geopedia

Populated places in the Municipality of Sveti Jurij ob Ščavnici